Octav Chelaru (born 30 September 1991) is a Romanian film director and screenwriter. He wrote and directed the short films Black Clothes (2017) and The Parallel State (2020) which both premiered in Pardi di Domani at Locarno Festival. In 2021, he wrote and directed the feature film A Higher Law.

Debut film 
His feature film directorial debut called A Higher Law, a Romanian-German-Serbian co-production starring Mălina Manovici and Alexandru Papadopol, was developed for five years at various film workshops, screenwriting residencies and co-production markets. 

In 2017, the project was selected at the Villa Kult Residency in Berlin, the Transilvania Pitch Stop in Cluj-Napoca and the Pustnik Screenwriters' Residency. In 2018, it went to Midpoint Feature Launch (Czech Republic, Serbia, Italy), to Less is More Development Programme (France, Poland, Romania), to the CineLink Workshop and Co-production Market at the Sarajevo Film Festival and to the International Project Discovery Forum at the Los Angeles Greek Film Festival. Later in the process, it was selected to the 2019 APostLab Post Production Workshop in Bucharest, the 2020 Work in Progress of the Les Films de Cannes à Bucarest, the 2021 Closed Screenings of the Transilvania International Film Festival and the 2021 First Cut+ Lab at the Trieste Film Festival.

The film had the World premiere at the 62nd edition of the Thessaloniki International Film Festival and the Asian premiere at the 52nd International Film Festival of India. Later, it was selected at the 49th edition of the Film Fest Ghent and the 26th edition of the International Film Festival of Kerala.

In Romania, A Higher Law premiered in the Official Competition of the 21st edition of the Transilvania International Film Festival. After sold-out screenings in Cluj-Napoca and positive reviews, previews of the film were screened all over the country: in Timișoara at the Ceau, Cinema! Film Festival and Cinema Victoria, in Sibiu at the TIFF Sibiu and Centrul Cultural “Ion Besoiu”, in Iași at the Serile Filmului Românesc, in Cluj-Napoca at Cinema Victoria, in Bucharest at Cinema Elvire Popesco, at Grădina cu Filme and at the National Theatre Bucharest during Noaptea Albă a Filmului Românesc, in the Danube Delta at the Anonimul International Independent Film Festival, in Alba-Iulia at the Alba Iulia Music & Film Festival, in Oradea at the TIFF Oradea, in Arad at Cinema Arta, in Satu Mare County at the Caravana Filmelor TIFF Unlimited, in Constanța at the Sunscreen Film & Arts Festival, in Piatra Neamț at Cinema Mon Amour, in Brașov at Centrul Cultural Reduta, in Buzău at Buzău International Arts Festival where it won the Best Film Award and in the neighbouring Chișinău at Zilele Filmului Românesc.

The film had the Gala Premiere on 29th of August, 2022, at the Romanian Athenaeum and was released in cinemas nationwide on 9th of September, 2022. 

A Higher Law was released in the Cinema City network (Arad, Bacău, Bucharest, Brașov, Brăila, Cluj-Napoca, Constanța, Iași, Ploiești, Râmnicu Vâlcea, Suceava, Târgu Mureș and Timișoara). Other cinemas around the country screened the film, as follows: in Bucharest (Cineplexx Băneasa, Hollywood Multiplex, Cinema Elvire Popesco, Cinema Europa, Cinema Muzeul Țăranului Român, Cinema Movieplex, Cinema Union), Cluj-Napoca (Cinema Arta, Cinema Florin Piersic, Cinema Victoria), Timișoara (Cinema Victoria), Iași (Cinema Ateneu), Arad (Cinema Arta), Sibiu (Cinegold, Cinema Arta), Craiova (Cinema Patria), Piatra Neamț (Cinema Mon Amour), Pitești (Cinema Trivale), Focșani (Sala Balada), Miercurea-Ciuc (Cinema Csíki Mozi), Sfântu Gheorghe (Cinema Arta - Művész Mozi), Slobozia (Casa Municipală de Cultură "Nicolae Rotaru") and Odobești (Casa de Cultură).

The film was nominated for 8 categories at the 2023 edition of the Gopo Awards, the Romanian equivalent of the Spain's Goya Awards or the France's César Awards. Octav Chelaru was nominated for Best Debut Film and Best Screenplay, Mălina Manovici for Best Actress in a Leading Role, Sergiu Smerea for Best Supporting Actor, Barbu Bălășoiu for Best Cinematography, Dragoș Apetri for Best Editing, Martin Kohlstedt for Best Original Music, and the sound team (Johannes Doberenz - sound recordist, Sebastian Schmidt - sound designer, Christoph Wieczorek - re-recording mixer) for Best Sound. The gala will take place on the 25th of April, 2023.

Sophomore film 
His sophomore feature film has the working title Rara Avis and it will be developed at the Pustnik Screenwriters' Residency.

Filmography

References

External links 

Films in Frame - interview by film critic Ionuț Mareș
Faith and Freedom Put to the Test in Octav Chelaru’s Feature Debut ‘A Higher Law’

Romanian film directors
Romanian screenwriters
People from Piatra Neamț
Living people
1991 births